Azrul Azmi (born 19 July 1988) is a Malaysian footballer currently playing for Kuala Lumpur, on loan from Felda United FC in Malaysia Super League. He was born in Penang.

External links
 

1988 births
Living people
Malaysian footballers
People from Penang
Association football defenders
UPB-MyTeam FC players
Kuala Lumpur City F.C. players
Felda United F.C. players